The Blue Tiger (manufacturer designation: DE-AC33C) is a type of high powered diesel-electric locomotive developed by ADtranz in association with General Electric.

History and design 
The prototype was unveiled in 1996.

Initially the axle load was expected to be a light  and the power at ~.

General Electric supplied diesel engines and electrical transmission system (which used IGBT-based inverters driving AC traction motors). The rest of the locomotive was built by AdTranz in Kassel.

For the Pakistani export models a 16-cylinder engine was used.

Bombardier took over AdTranz in 2001, subsequently the Blue Tiger locomotive was shown at InnoTrans in 2002 with a view to European orders.

As of 2009, the class is no longer listed as a production model by Bombardier; GE also lists the family as a former production type. For the European market, Bombardier produces the less powerful diesel variants of the TRAXX family, whilst GE offers variants of its Evolution series for export.

Operators

Pakistan 
The first orders for the locomotives came from Pakistan Railways in the late 1990s. The first ten were shipped out, the remainder assembled under license in Pakistan.
Pakistan Locomotive Series Start From 6001 to 6030.

Malaysia

Twenty locomotives were built to  gauge in 2003–2004 for KTM. They were designated as "Class 26" (Numbers: 26101 – 26120). 

All the locomotives were named after capes in Malaysia. In the first decade of operations the locomotives proved more reliable than the Malaysian Class 29 locomotives bought at around the same time.

Germany 

10 Locomotives were built to  gauge with a view to leasing or orders.

Various companies have used the locomotives. Initially Karsdorfer Eisenbahngesellschaft GmbH (KEG) was to use 8 units, but went bankrupt in 2005. In 2006, the distribution was:
Osthannoversche Eisenbahnen (5 units including the prototype)
ITL Eisenbahngesellschaft (Import Transport Logistik) (2 units)
Havelländische Eisenbahnen AG (4 units)

Models 

A working scale model of this locomotive has been produced by the Slovenian company Mehano in N, TT and HO scale.

References

External links 

 Blue Tiger images (Europe) railfaneurope.net
 Bombardier FLEXXX Bogies FLEXX Power 120 type used in Blue Tiger locomotives

Co′Co′ locomotives
Co-Co locomotives
Adtranz locomotives
Keretapi Tanah Melayu
Diesel-electric locomotives of Malaysia
Diesel-electric locomotives of Pakistan
Railway locomotives introduced in 1996
Diesel-electric locomotives of Germany